Clarence Scott (born April 9, 1949) is a former American football safety who played 13 seasons in the NFL from 1971 to 1983 for the Cleveland Browns.

High school career 
Scott was raised in Decatur, Georgia and attended the former African-American school Trinity High School in Decatur. As a junior in 1965, Scott helped Trinity to a state title.

College career 
Scott played college football at Kansas State University, where he was named an All-American following the 1970 season.

Professional career 
He was the first defensive back selected in the 1971 NFL Draft at 14th in the first round by the Browns. He proved to be a steady presence with the Browns, earning Pro Bowl honors in 1973, a season in which he had five interceptions for 71 yards and one touchdown.

Personal life 
He now resides in the Metro-Atlanta Area with his wife of 16 years, Eleanor. Scott has three grown children from a previous marriage, one son and two daughters, and four grandchildren. As for hobbies, Clarence and Eleanor like to travel, and Clarence enjoys working out and playing basketball.

References

External links
http://www.pro-football-reference.com/players/ScotCl00.htm

1949 births
Living people
Players of American football from Atlanta
American football safeties
American Conference Pro Bowl players
Kansas State Wildcats football players
Cleveland Browns players